Symphony No. 9 in D minor may refer to:

Symphony No. 9 (Beethoven), Op. 125 (1824) by Ludwig van Beethoven
Symphony No. 9 (Bruckner) (1887–1896, unfinished, first performed in 1903) by Anton Bruckner

See also
Symphony No. 9 (disambiguation)
List of symphonies in D minor